The 1943 Great Lakes Navy Bluejackets football team represented the United States Navy's Great Lakes Naval Training Station (Great Lakes NTS) during the 1943 college football season. The team compiled a 10–2 record, outscored opponents by a total of 257 to 108, and was ranked No. 6 in the final AP Poll. Tony Hinkle, who coached at Butler University before the war, was in his second season as head coach.

The Bluejackets played multiple games against teams that were ranked in the final AP Poll, including an upset of national champion Notre Dame in the final game of the season. The team's two losses were to Purdue and Northwestern, which finished the season ranked No. 5 and No 9, respectively, in the final AP Poll.

Schedule

Rankings

References

Great Lakes Navy
Great Lakes Navy Bluejackets football seasons
Great Lakes Navy Bluejackets football